Ya'qūb ibn al-Layth al-Saffār (25 October 840 – 5 June 879), was a coppersmith and the founder of the Saffarid dynasty of Sistan, with its capital at Zaranj (a city now in south-western Afghanistan). Under his military leadership, he conquered much of the eastern portions of  Greater Iran consisting of modern-day Iran, Afghanistan, Turkmenistan, Uzbekistan, Tajikistan as well as portions of western Pakistan and a small part of Iraq. He was succeeded by his brother, Amr ibn al-Layth.

Early life
Ya'qub was born in 840, of eastern Iranian origins, in a small town called Karnin (Qarnin), which was located east of Zaranj and west of Bost (Lashkargah), in what is now Afghanistan. Information about his genealogy and social background is lacking. Clifford Edmund Bosworth explains that several Sunni sources were invariably hostile to Ya'qub because of the disrespect he showed toward the Abbasid caliph. "Some sources accused Ya'qub of being a Khariji, Ibn Khallikan labeled him a Christian, and Nizam al-Mulk claimed that he converted to Ismailism". However, these claims came roughly a century after Yaqub's death, and most sources agree on Ya'qub's ascetic lifestyle.

According to numerous sources, he was extremely poor, and because of this, he occasionally consumed bread and onions. His family moved to the city of Zaranj due to the occasional sectarian violence between the Sunnis and Kharijites. Ya'qub began work as a coppersmith ("saffar"), while his brother Amr ibn al-Layth worked as a mule-hirer.

Rise to power 
Ya'qub, along with his brothers Amr ibn al-Layth, Tahir ibn al-Layth and Ali ibn al-Layth, later joined the ayyars under Salih ibn al-Nadr, who had opposed the Abbasids and began ruling in Bost. By 854, the ayyars managed to expel Ibrahim ibn al-Hudain, who was the Tahirid governor of Sistan. Another ayyar leader, Dirham ibn Nasr, succeeded in unseating Salih as the king of Sistan in 858. However, in 861, Ya'qub overthrew Dirham, and gave himself the title of Emir at that point.

Reign

Campaigns in Sistan and Khorasan

Ya'qub attracted the attention of an Abbasid caliph by first battling Kharijites in his homeland of Sistan. In 864, "Yaʿqub led an expedition to Bost against his former master Salih, and then into Rukkaj and Zamindāvar against the local ruler there, the Zunbil, killing him and securing an immense booty." He also managed to capture several family members of the Zunbils, including the Zunbil king's son. He then vanquished the Hindu Shahis, conquering their capital Kabul. He later moved against the Kharijites in northern Sistan, winning a decisive victory and killing their leader Ammar ibn Yaser in 865. Ya'qub's campaigns marked the decline of militant Kharijism in the East. After having defeated the Ammar, Ya'qub held a celebration. During the celebration, one of the members of the court made a speech in Arabic. Ya'qub asked the latter why he made a speech in a language which he could not understand. One of Ya'qub's secretaries, Muhammad ibn Vasif, then made a qasida in Persian.

Ya'qub claimed the inheritance of the kings of Persia and sought "to revive their glory," and thus in 867 he sent a poem written by himself to the Abbasid caliph Al-Mu'tazz. The poem said: "With me is the Derafsh Kaviani, through which I hope to rule the nations."

In 870/871, Ya'qub marched against the Kharijites of Herat, and defeated them. He then marched towards Karukh, and defeated another Khariji leader who was named Abd al-Rahman. Ya'qub then pardoned Abd al-Rahman and made him governor of Isfizar.

His army would later march to Ghazna, Kabul, and Bamyan, conquering these territories from the Hindu Shahi in the name of Islam, and appointing Muslim governors. From there they moved to north of the Hindu Kush and by 870 AD the whole of Khorasan was brought under their control. The Panjshir Valley was now under Ya'qub's control, which made him able to mint silver coins. In 873, Ya'qub ousted the Tahirids from their own capital of Nishapur, and captured its ruler Muhammad ibn Tahir, which led to conflicts with the Abbasid caliphate. During one of Ya'qub's numerous battles, his face was disfigured to the point that he could only eat through a pipe in his mouth for twenty days.

Campaigns in Western Iran
Ya'qub set out west for Fars with the intention of subjugating the province. Sources disagree on what happened next, but Ya'qub was eventually dissuaded from continuing his expedition, and he turned back toward Sistan. His withdrawal is described as having been caused either by the governor Muhammad ibn Wasil's submission to him, or by the arrival of emissaries sent by the caliphal government to convince him to abandon his westward advance. In either case, Muhammad soon afterwards reached a rapprochement with the central government, and in 872 he handed over the kharaj (tax revenues), and possibly the government of Fars, to a caliphal representative. Ya'qub later traveled to Tabaristan in 874, and battled the Zaydid leader al-Hasan ibn Zayd. Ya'qub collected taxes in Tabaristan's capital Amul before departing for Rayy.

Ya'qub ibn al-Layth once again set out for Fars, this time, invading it and advancing to Estakhr, seizing Muhammad's treasuries there. Muhammad departed from Khuzestan, and returned to Fars in an attempt to stop Ya'qub. They met near Lake Bakhtegan in August 875, and in the resulting battle, Muhammad, despite having a numerically superior army, was defeated. Muhammad was forced to flee; Ya'qub looted Muhammad's stronghold at Sa'idabad and took control of Fars.

In 876, the Abbasid representative Al-Muwaffaq offered Ya'qub governorship of Khurasan, Tabaristan, Fars, Gurgan, and Ray, and to appoint him as head of security in Baghdad. Ya'qub, sensing that the offer was made due to the weakness of the caliph, rejected it and wrote back that he would be advancing to the capital. The offer also alienated the Turks of Samarra, who felt that Ya'qub represented a threat to their interests. Seeing that an agreement with the Saffarid was impossible, the Abbasid caliph al-Mu'tamid decided upon war and pronounced a formal curse upon Ya'qub. On 7 March 876, al-Mu'tamid left Samarra, leaving his son Al-Mufawwad in charge of the capital. On 15 March he arrived at Baghdad, before arriving near Kalwadha and setting up camp.

Ya'qub traveled through Khuzistan, during which he gained the defection of a former general of the caliph's, Abi'l-Saj Devdad, and entered Iraq. The caliphal general Masrur al-Balkhi managed to slow down his progress by flooding the land outside Wasit, but the Saffarid army was able to get through this and he entered Wasit on 24 March. Leaving Wasit, he set out for the town of Dayr al-`Aqul, which was about fifty miles from Baghdad. According to one source, Ya'qub did not actually expect the caliph to offer battle; instead he would give in to any demands that the Saffarid had. Al-Mu'tamid, however, sent al-Muwaffaq to stop him. The two armies met at Istarband, between Dayr al-`Aqul and Sib Bani Kuma.

The Battle of Dayr al-Aqul took place on 8 April. Before the battle, Ya'qub reviewed his troops, who apparently numbered about ten thousand. The Abbasids, however, had a numerical superiority and the additional advantage of fighting on familiar territory. The center of the Abbasid army was commanded by al-Muwaffaq. Musa bin Bugha had command of the right wing, and Masrur al-Balkhi the left. A final appeal was made to the Saffarids to restore their loyalty to the caliph, and the battle began.

The fighting raged on for most of the day. The Saffarid army was somewhat reluctant to directly fight the caliph and his army. Despite this, there were heavy losses on both sides, and several Abbasid and Saffarid commanders were killed. Ya'qub himself was wounded, but he did not leave the field. As evening approached, reinforcements arrived to support al-Muwaffaq. The mawla Nusayr created a diversion by attacking the Saffarid rear from boats on the Tigris and setting fire to the Saffarid baggage train, giving the Abbasids a further advantage.

Eventually the Saffarid army began to flee from the battle. Ya'qub and his bodyguards continued to fight, but were forced to leave the field as the army retreated, leaving them behind. The caliph had apparently flooded the lands behind the Saffarids before the battle, and this made a retreat difficult; many men drowned attempting to escape the Abbasid army. With the Saffarids making their hasty exit, al-Muwaffaq was able to capture Ya'qub's baggage. Several political prisoners that Ya'qub had brought with him, such as the Tahirid Muhammad bin Tahir, also fell into Abbasid hands and were freed.

Ya'qub then withdrew from Iraq and died three years later.

Ideology 

The motivation behind the Saffarids' initial campaigns remains unknown and highly debated in secondary scholarship. Some scholars believe that Ya'qub fought as a ghazi warrior for the purpose of spreading proto-Sunni Islam, others support the notion that he was motivated by his Persian identity,  while others believed he had a love for military conquest. Ya'qub's hostility towards the Abbasid caliphs was easily seen. 

The religion of the Saffarid's founder, Ya'qub, has been a topic of debate. Most of the primary sources were written during or after the fall of the Samanid dynasty and view the Saffarids through Samanid eyes. These primary sources depict Ya'qub either as a religious rascal or a volunteer Sunni warrior - a mutatawwi. C.E. Bosworth states the early Saffarid emirs did not appear to have significant religious beliefs. The vizier Nizam al-Mulk, obsessed with the integrity of the Seljuk Empire, depicts Ya'qub as an Ismaili convert. 

According to the Tarikh-i Sistan, Ya'qub even said that the Abbasids were liars, and also said: "Haven't you seen what they did to Abu Salama, Abu Muslim, the Barmakid family and Fadl ibn Sahl, despite everything which these men had done on the dynasty's behalf? Let no one ever trust them!"

Death

Ya'qub suffered from colic and was refusing treatments when advised to do so. As a result, he died on Wednesday, 5 June 879, in Gundeshapur. He was soon after succeeded by his brother Amr Saffari. Although he was not viewed as a gentleman, he also did not exercise any special cruelty. It was reported that he did not smile much, and was called "the anvil" by one of his enemies. According to Ibn Khallikan, his wife was an Arab woman from Sistan, although all other sources, including Ibn Athir and Juzjani, claim that Yaqub never married.

Legacy
It was during Ya'qub's rule that Persian was introduced as an official language, and Ya'qub reportedly did not know Arabic. Ya'qub has been accorded the historical status of a popular folk hero since his court began the revitalization of the Persian language after two centuries in which the Arabic language flourished in Persian lands. Several poets, like Abu Ishaq Ibrahim ibn Mamshadh, fabricated Ya'qub's genealogy, tracing it back to the legendary Iranian king Jamshid. Ya'qub is also sometimes perceived as one of the first autonomous rulers in Khurasan since the Islamic conquests. Ya'qub's campaigns in fact also marked the early stage in the decline of caliphal political unity in the Islamic world, which was further worsened by the ghulams and the Dailamites.

Notes

References

Sources
 
 
 
 
 
 
 
 
 

 
  Volume I, Volume III

Further reading
 

 

Rulers of the Saffarid dynasty
840 births
879 deaths
Rebels from the Abbasid Caliphate
9th-century Iranian people
Coppersmiths